Bajela is a town in the north-central Mudug region of Somalia. 

Populated places in Mudug
Galmudug